Viktor Viktorovych Kovalenko (born 14 February 1996) is a Ukrainian professional footballer who plays as a midfielder for Serie A club Spezia, on loan from Atalanta. He represents the Ukraine national team.

Club career

Shakhtar Donetsk
Kovalenko is product of youth team of Shakhtar Donetsk. He made his début in the Ukrainian Premier League for Shakhtar in the game against Vorskla Poltava on 28 February 2015. On 9 May 2015, he made his first direct contribution for the first team when assisting the fifth and sixth goals for Shakhtar in a 7–3 win over Hoverla Uzhhorod.

On 20 February 2020, Kovalenko scored the winning goal in Shakhtar's 2–1 win against Benfica in the first leg of their Europa League Round of 32 clash.

On 17 October 2020, Kovalenko scored twice in the first 18 minutes of Shakhtar's 5–1 hammering of FC Lviv in the Ukrainian Premier League.

Atalanta
On 1 February 2021, with less than six months remaining in his contract with Shakhtar, Kovalenko signed a four-and-a-half-year deal with Serie A club Atalanta for a reported fee of €700,000. He made his debut for the club on 21 March, as an 87th-minute substitute for fellow countryman Ruslan Malinovskyi in a Serie A 2–0 win at Verona.

Loans to Spezia
On 8 August 2021, Kovalenko joined fellow Serie A side Spezia on a season-long loan.

On 2 August 2022, he returned to Spezia on another loan, with Spezia holding an obligation to buy if the club avoids relegation.

International career
Kovalenko was called up by Ukraine to play in the 2015 FIFA U-20 World Cup in New Zealand. He scored two goals in a 6–0 victory over Myanmar and added a hat-trick against the United States to secure 3–0 win at North Harbour Stadium in Auckland, as the team reached the round of 16. He won the Golden Boot of the 2015 FIFA U-20 World Cup with five goals.

Career statistics

Club

International

Honours
Shakhtar Donetsk
Ukrainian Premier League: 2016–17, 2017–18, 2018–19, 2019–20
Ukrainian Cup: 2015–16, 2016–17, 2017–18, 2018–19
Ukrainian Super Cup: 2015, 2017

Individual
 FIFA World Youth Championship Golden  Shoe: 2015
 Ukrainian Premier League Best young player: 2015–16

References

External links

Viktor Kovalenko at Topforward

1996 births
Living people
Sportspeople from Kherson
Ukrainian footballers
Association football midfielders
FC Shakhtar Donetsk players
Atalanta B.C. players
Spezia Calcio players
Ukrainian Premier League players
Serie A players
Ukraine international footballers
Ukraine under-21 international footballers
Ukraine youth international footballers
UEFA Euro 2016 players
Ukrainian expatriate footballers
Ukrainian expatriate sportspeople in Italy
Expatriate footballers in Italy